

Final table

External links
RSSSF on PSL 00/01

2000-01
2000–01 in African association football leagues
2000–01 in South African soccer